Sikorski (feminine: Sikorska, plural: Sikorscy) is a Polish-language surname. It belongs to several noble Polish–Lithuanian Commonwealth families, see . Variants (via other languages) include Sikorsky, Sikorskyi, and Sikorskiy.

There are several possible origins of the surname. It may originate from the numerous Polish locations named Sikory and literally it is an adjective meaning "of Sikory"/"from Sikory". Other possible locations of origin include Sikorzyn, Sikorz, Sikorze, Sikorycze. Still another origin is from the nickname Sikora, with the main meaning "tit" (bird) and several figurative meanings in Polish.

Notable people with this surname include:

 Ada Fighiera Sikorska, Polish Esperantist
 Aleksandra Sikorska, Polish volleyball player
 Andrzej Sikorski (born 1961), Polish cyclist
 Bobo Sikorski (1927 – 2014), Canadian football player
 Brian Sikorski (born 1974), American baseball player
 Daniel Sikorski (born 1987), Austrian footballer
 Franciszek Sikorski (1889-1940), Polish engineer an general
 Gerry Sikorski, American politician and lawyer
 Hans Sikorski, the founder of Hans Sikorski, music publishing house in Hamburg, Germany
 Igor Sikorski (skier), German-born Polish male paralympic alpine skier
 Igor Ivanovich Sikorsky, a Ukrainian-born pioneer in helicopters and fixed-wing aircraft; founder of Sikorsky Aircraft in Stratford, Connecticut
 Jerzy Sikorski (born 1935), Polish historian and writer
 Jolanta Sikorska-Kulesza (born 1957), Polish historian
 Kazimierz Sikorski (1895-1986), Polish composer
 Krystian Sikorski, Polish ice hockey player
 Radosław Sikorski (born 1963), Polish politician and statesman
 Roman Sikorski (1920–1983), Polish mathematician
 Tomasz Sikorski (1939 – 1988)Polish composer and pianist
 Władysław Sikorski (1881–1943), Polish general and Prime Minister in exile during World War II

Fictional characters
 Rudolf Sikorski, fictional character in several Strugatskys' novels

References

Polish-language surnames
Polish toponymic surnames